James Isdell (1849 – 5 October 1919) was an Australian pastoralist and politician who was a member of the Legislative Assembly of Western Australia from 1903 to 1906, representing the seat of Pilbara.

Isdell was born in Victoria, and came to Western Australia in 1884. He managed a station near Roebourne for a period, and later acquired several pastoral leases of his own in the Kimberley, including Croydon Station. Isdell was elected to parliament at the 1903 Pilbara by-election, which had been caused by the resignation of Walter Kingsmill. He was re-elected at the 1904 and 1905 state elections, but resigned in June 1906, stating that it was too expensive to properly represent his constituency.

After leaving parliament, Isdell managed a mine at Nullagine for a period, and later served as a Protector of Aborigines. He was appointed "Travelling Protector" in 1907 and in this role oversaw the forced removal of mixed race children from their Indigenous parents, which he considered a moral duty, once telling his superior “I consider it a great scandal to allow any of these half-caste girls to remain with the natives.”

Isdell also authored several books on the future of the Pilbara region. He died in Perth in October 1919, having spent the last few years of his life in poverty.

See also
 Isdell River, named after Isdell in 1898

References

1849 births
1919 deaths
Australian pastoralists
Members of the Western Australian Legislative Assembly
People from Victoria (Australia)
19th-century Australian businesspeople